Genesis supported their 1997 album Calling All Stations with a 47-date European tour from 29 January to 31 May 1998, featuring shows in large arenas throughout Europe. The core trio of lead vocalist Ray Wilson, keyboardist Tony Banks, and guitarist/bassist Mike Rutherford were joined by Israeli musician Nir Zidkyahu on drums, percussion, and backing vocals and Irish musician Anthony Drennan on guitar and bass. This was the only tour with Wilson, Zidkyahu and Drennan, as well as the first since 1978 not to feature longtime singer/drummer Phil Collins or touring members Daryl Stuermer and Chester Thompson as part of the lineup. Rehearsals took place at Bray Film Studios in Windsor and the Working Men's Club in Chiddingfold, England close the band's recording studio. The tour concluded with spots at the Rock am Ring and Rock im Park Festival in Germany. A majority of the older songs were transposed in a lower key to accommodate Wilson's lower vocal range. Midway through the set included an acoustic medley of songs from their 1970s output.

A 23-date North American tour in large arenas was booked to start in November 1997 but it was cancelled due to insufficient ticket sales, along with a revised 20-date schedule in smaller venues. At the European tour's conclusion, Genesis went on hiatus; Wilson was later informed by Banks and Rutherford that the band would not be continuing. It would be the band's final full-length tour until Collins returned for the 2007 Turn It On Again reunion tour. The tour is captured live on the promotional album Calling Radio Stations, and various unofficial albums.

Setlist 
No Son of Mine
Land Of Confusion
The Lamb Lies Down on Broadway
Calling All Stations
The Carpet Crawlers
There Must Be Some Other Way *or* Alien Afternoon
Domino
Firth of Fifth (Part 2)
Congo
Home by the Sea / Second Home by the Sea
Acoustic Set (Dancing With The Moonlit Knight (Excerpt), Follow You Follow Me (Excerpt), Supper's Ready (Lover's Leap) (Excerpt), Not About Us)
Mama
The Dividing Line
Invisible Touch
Turn It On Again

Encore
Throwing It All Away
I Can't Dance (w/ Audience Participation)

Additional songs
"That's All" dropped in favour of "Alien Afternoon"
"Hold On My Heart" dropped in favour of "Shipwrecked"
"Shipwrecked" dropped to make set shorter.
"Alien Afternoon" and "There Must Be Some Other Way" occasionally swap with each other to also help make the set shorter as it was originally too long for the band to do every night.
"Not About Us" added to the acoustic set.

Rehearsal songs (never played during the tour)
Small Talk

Personnel 
Genesis
 Ray Wilson – lead vocals
 Tony Banks – keyboards, backing vocals
 Mike Rutherford – guitars, bass, backing vocals

Additional musicians
 Anthony Drennan – bass, guitar, additional backing vocals
 Nir Zidkyahu – drums, percussion, backing vocals on "Follow You Follow Me"

Tour dates 

+ Filmed for television
 Filmed privately

References

1998 concert tours
Genesis (band) concert tours